This is a record of Iraq's results at the AFC Asian Cup. Iraq have appeared in the finals of the AFC Asian Cup on 9 occasions in 1972 to 1976, 1996 to 2019. Their best ever performance is a champions in the 2007 tournament held in Indonesia, Malaysia, Thailand and Vietnam respectively.

Records

Record by opponent

*Iraq defeated Iran in the 2015 quarter-finals via penalty shoot-out**Iraq defeated South Korea in both the 1972 preliminary round and the 2007 semi-finals via penalty shoot-out

Record results

Thailand 1972

Group allocation match

Group A

Iran 1976

Group B

Semi-finals

Third place match

United Arab Emirates 1996

Group B

Quarterfinal

Lebanon 2000

Group A

Quarterfinal

China 2004

Group C

Quarterfinal

Indonesia/Malaysia/Thailand/Vietnam 2007

Group A

Quarterfinal

Semifinal

Final

Qatar 2011

Group D

Quarterfinal

Australia 2015

Group D

Quarterfinal

Semifinal

Third place match

United Arab Emirates 2019

Group D

Round of 16

External links
 Iraqi Football Website
 Iraq at the 2007 Asian Cup
 10 Best Moments in Iraqi Football
 History of Iraq National Team

 
Countries at the AFC Asian Cup
AFC